Whalers Bay is a small bay entered between Fildes Point and Penfold Point at the east side of Port Foster, Deception Island, in the South Shetland Islands of Antarctica. The bay was so named by the French Antarctic Expedition, 1908–10, under Charcot, because of its use at that time by whalers.

Historic site
The site has been designated a Historic Site or Monument (HSM 71), following a proposal by Chile and Norway to the Antarctic Treaty Consultative Meeting. It comprises all pre-1970 remains on the shore of the bay. These include artefacts and structural remains from the early whaling period (1906–1912) associated with Captain Adolfus Andresen of the Chilean Sociedad Ballenera de Magallanes, the Norwegian Hektor Whaling Station (1912–1931), the period of British scientific and mapping activity (1944–1969 by Operation Tabarin, Falkland Islands Dependencies Survey, British Antarctic Survey), and a cemetery containing 35 burials and a memorial to ten men lost at sea. It also commemorates and acknowledges the historic value of other events that occurred there.

References

Further reading

External links
SCAR Composite Gazetteer of Antarctica
Secretariat of the Antarctic Treaty Visitor Guidelines and island description
British Antarctic Survey - History of Station B, Deception Island

Geography of Deception Island
Bays of the South Shetland Islands
Historic Sites and Monuments of Antarctica
Cemeteries in Antarctica
Former populated places